The Stuttgart Scorpions are an American football team from Stuttgart, Germany. The club's greatest success came in 2007, when it reached the German Bowl but lost to the Braunschweig Lions.

History
The Stuttgart Scorpions were formed in December 1982. The new club spent its first couple of seasons in the 2nd Bundesliga, now the German Football League 2, where it played until 1985.

The club, after having earned promotion, spent the 1986 and 1987 season in the central division of the American Football Bundesliga, now the German Football League, but was only able to win one game in two years and found itself relegated back to the second tier for 1988. At this league, the team once more was a top performer and won two division titles in 1990 and 1991, with the later also earning promotion to the Bundesliga once more.

The Scorpions once more struggled at top level and were immediately relegated again. After coming second in 1993 and winning its division the following year, the Scorpions were able to defeat the Franken Knights 47–0 in the promotion round and moved up for a third time in their history.

The club was now much improved at the top level and reached the quarter finals in its first two seasons back, 1995 and 1996. After a difficult 1997 season, when survival was only assured in the relegation round against the Saarland Hurricanes, the Scorpions would finally be able to deliver constant top-level performances. From 1998 onwards, the team was to reach the play-offs every season.

The Stuttgart Scorpions won the southern division of the Bundesliga in 1998 and were able to reach the semi finals of the German championship for the first time. In 2001, 2002 and 2006, this play-off performance was repeated, in between, the club was knocked out in the semi finals. The 2007 season was to be the club's best-ever, first winning the southern division of the GFL for only the second time and then progressing all the way to the German Bowl. In this game, the Scorpions were defeated 27–6 by the Braunschweig Lions, despite playing at home in Stuttgart.

Since then, the team's performances have fallen off, only being able to reach the quarter finals of the championship in 2008, 2009 and 2010. In 2011, the side finished third in its division, qualifying for the play-offs once more, where they lost to the Mönchengladbach Mavericks.

In 2012, the club came fourth in the southern division of the GFL and qualified for the play-off where it was knocked out by Kiel Baltic Hurricanes in the quarter finals. After 15 consecutive play-off qualifications the club came only sixth in 2013 and missed the finals for the first time since 1997.

In 2014, the club finished second in the southern division of the GFL but lost 28–33 to the Cologne Falcons in the quarter finals of the play-offs. After a third-place finish in 2015 the club lost to the Dresden Monarchs in the quarter finals of the play-offs.

In 2021, the Scorpions received an offer to become a franchise of the newly established European League of Football ELF which sees itself as a continuation of World League of American Football WLAF and NFL Europe. A 2/3 majority of the member base rejected the offer, but management and coaching staff decided to join the Stuttgart ELF franchise. Since the Scorpions rejected an ELF cooperation, the WLAF "Sacracmento Surge" (1992 World Bowl champion) was revived as "Stuttgart Surge". The Scorpions remain a constituent of the GFL.

Honours
 German Bowl
 Runners-up: 2007
 EFL
 Participations: 2008
 GFL
 Southern Division champions: (2) 1998, 2007
 Play-off qualification: (20) 1995, 1996, 1998–2012, 2014, 2015, 2019
 League membership: (29) 1986–1987, 1992, 1995–2021
 GFL2
 Central Division champions: 1985, 1990, 1991, 1994
 Junior Bowl
 Runners-up: 1992, 1999, 2001, 2007, 2008

German Bowl appearances
The club has only appeared once in the German Bowl:

 Champions in bold.

Recent seasons
Recent seasons of the Scorpions:

 RR = Relegation round.
 QF = Quarter finals.
 SF = Semi finals.
 GB = German Bowl

References

External links
  Official website
  German Football League official website
  Football History Historic American football tables from Germany

American football teams in Germany
German Football League teams
American football teams established in 1982
Sport in Stuttgart
1982 establishments in West Germany